The Lincoln Avenue Viaduct, also known as the Cantrell Road Bridge, is a historic bridge, now carrying the westbound lanes of Cantrell Road (Arkansas Highway 10) across railroad tracks in downtown Little Rock, Arkansas. The bridge was built in 1928 by the Missouri-Pacific Railroad and given to the city; it is the only bridge of its type in the state.

The bridge was listed on the National Register of Historic Places in 1990.

See also
List of bridges documented by the Historic American Engineering Record in Arkansas
List of bridges on the National Register of Historic Places in Arkansas
National Register of Historic Places listings in Little Rock, Arkansas

References

External links

Historic American Engineering Record in Arkansas
Road bridges on the National Register of Historic Places in Arkansas
Bridges completed in 1928
National Register of Historic Places in Little Rock, Arkansas
Tied arch bridges in the United States
Concrete bridges in the United States
Steel bridges in the United States
1928 establishments in Arkansas
Transportation in Little Rock, Arkansas
Arch bridges in the United States
Missouri Pacific Railroad